The Employment Act 1990 is a piece of industrial relations legislation of the United Kingdom.

The Act banned closed shops, which had already been restricted by the Employment Act 1982 by requiring 80-85% to support them (such an impractical requirement that they had been effectively almost banned). It also banned secondary action in industrial disputes, again building on restrictions on that form of picketing introduced by the Employment Act 1980.

Sources
Employment Act 1990, as enacted. Legislation.gov.uk, retrieved 16 July 2017

United Kingdom Acts of Parliament 1990